During the 2003–04 English football season, Watford F.C. competed in the First Division.

Season summary
The ongoing financial difficulties saw a large number of players released that summer, including record signing Allan Nielsen and strikers Tommy Smith and Gifton Noel-Williams. To make matters worse, Manchester United loanee Jimmy Davis was killed in a car crash on the opening day of the new campaign. This had a huge effect on the team's form at the beginning of the season, and notably on his close friend Danny Webber. But a strong finish to the season saw the club finish in mid-table.

Final league table

Results
Watford's score comes first

Legend

Football League First Division

FA Cup

League Cup

Players

First-team squad

Left club during season

References

Notes

Watford F.C. seasons
Watford